General elections were held in Malaysia on Saturday, 10 May 1969, although voting was postponed until between 6 June and 4 July 1970 in Sabah and Sarawak. This election marked the first parliamentary election held in Sabah and Sarawak after the formation of Malaysia in 1963.

The elections resulted in the return to power, with a reduced majority, of the ruling Alliance Party, comprising the United Malays National Organisation (UMNO), the Malayan Chinese Association, and the Malayan Indian Congress. The Parti Gerakan Rakyat Malaysia (Gerakan) and the Democratic Action Party (DAP), which had campaigned against Bumiputra privileges outlined by Article 153 of the Constitution, made major gains in the election. Voter turnout was 73.6%. Opposition won 54 seats in total causing the Alliance to lose its two-thirds majority in the Parliament (two-thirds majority being the majority required to pass most constitutional amendments) for the first time.

The elections also saw Alliance lose its majority in Perak, Selangor and Penang in addition to Kelantan. The result of the election and subsequent reactions would cause widespread race riots also known as the 13 May Incident. As a consequence of this incident, the federal government decided to suspend parliament and government administration was monitored by MAGERAN until 1971. It also marked the end of Tunku Abdul Rahman's administration as Prime Minister before he was succeeded by Tun Abdul Razak several months later. Razak would then seek the main purpose to establish the Federal Territory of Kuala Lumpur.

State elections also took place in 330 state constituencies in 12 (out of 13, except Sabah) states of Malaysia on the same day.

Results

Dewan Rakyat
Candidates were returned unopposed in 19 constituencies. Voting in one constituency was postponed.

West Malaysia went to the polls on 10 May, while Sabah was scheduled to vote on 25 May and Sarawak on 7 June. The Alliance won eight seats on nomination day being unopposed in some constituencies. Tun Mustapha Datu Harun's United Sabah National Organisation (USNO) won 10 out of 16 seats unopposed on nomination day.

The opposition parties' gain at state level was more shocking to the Alliance Party which not only continued to lose to PAS in Kelantan, but also to political infant Gerakan in Penang. No party commanded an absolute majority in two other states. The Alliance held only 14 out of 24 seats in Selangor and 19 out of 40 in Perak.

The attrition of Malay support was much higher than that of the non-Malays. Malay opposition parties' vote shares in the peninsula increased drastically from about 15% in 1964 to 25% in 1969 while the support for non-Malay opposition parties remained roughly the same at 26% in both elections. Thanks to the electoral system, however, PAS seats increased from nine to 12 seats only while non-Malay opposition party, DAP, from 1 to 13.

Results by state

Johore

Kedah

Kelantan

Malacca

Negri Sembilan

Pahang

Penang

Perak

Perlis

Sabah

Sarawak

Selangor

Trengganu

State Assemblies

Aftermath
Gerakan and DAP held a victory rally in Kuala Lumpur on 12 May, The rally soon turned rowdy, as party members and Malay bystanders started to shout racial epithets at each other. UMNO retaliated with its own rally on 13 May, which soon broke out into full-scale rioting, which subsequently became known as the 13 May Incident.

References

General elections in Malaysia
Malaysia
General
Malaysia